Alan John Hughes (born 4 April 1951 in Dublin, Republic of Ireland) is an Irish former cricketer. A right-handed batsman and right-arm medium pace bowler, he played five times for the Ireland cricket team between 1979 and 1982 including one List A match. He made his debut for Ireland against Worcestershire in August 1979. He took 4/95 in the Worcestershire first innings, his best bowling performance for Ireland. He played his only List A match the following year against Middlesex at Lord's. He played three more times for Ireland; against Canada in June 1981, against India in May 1982 and against the MCC in June 1982. He scored his only run for Ireland in the match against Canada. In all matches for Ireland, he took nine wickets at an average of 26.56. His cousin Patrick also represented Ireland at cricket. Hughes was president of Malahide Cricket Club and oversaw the club's hosting of its first One Day International between Ireland and England in 2013.

References

1951 births
Living people
Cricketers from Dublin (city)
Irish cricketers